Bahima disease is caused by iron deficiency in babies which are fed exclusively on cow's milk. It is characterized by a tower-shaped skull, dilatation of the diploe, and no signs of thalassaemia, sickle cell or other haemolytic anaemia.

It occurs most frequently in the Bahima people in Ankole, Uganda, from which it derives its name. The Bahima are a tribe that relies heavily on herding of long-horned cattle for survival.

References

External links
 J-Stor

Health in Africa
Red blood cell disorders
Mineral deficiencies